The 2021 UIM F1 H2O World Championship was the 37th season of Formula 1 Powerboat racing. Jonas Andersson won the championship.

Teams and drivers

Season calendar

Results and standings
Points are awarded to the top 10 classified finishers. A maximum of two boats per team are eligible for points in the teams' championship.

Drivers standings

References

2021 in motorsport
2021
2021 in boat racing